The 2004 Havant Borough Council election took place on 10 June 2004 to elect members of Havant Borough Council in Hampshire, England. One third of the council was up for election and the Conservative Party stayed in overall control of the council.

After the election, the composition of the council was:
Conservative 27
Labour 6
Liberal Democrats 5

Election result
The Conservatives gained seats to hold 27 of the 38 seats on the council, while Labour fell to 6 seats and the Liberal Democrats dropped to hold 5 seats. The Conservative gains included taking Barncroft and Battins wards in Leigh Park from Labour; the first time in over 30 years that Labour had not won all the seats in Leigh Park. Overall turnout at the election was 32.4%.

Ward results

Barncroft

Battins

Bedhampton

Bondfields

Cowplain

Emsworth

Hart Plain

Hayling East

Hayling West

Purbrook

St. Faiths

Stakes

Warren Park

Waterloo

By-elections between 2004 and 2006

References

2004 English local elections
Havant Borough Council elections
2000s in Hampshire